The East Germany national football team, recognised as Germany DR by FIFA, represented East Germany in men's international football, playing as one of three post-war German teams, along with Saarland and West Germany.

After German reunification in 1990, the Deutscher Fußball Verband der DDR (DFV), and with it the East German team, joined the Deutscher Fußball Bund (DFB) and the West Germany national football team that had just won the World Cup.

History
In 1949, before East Germany (GDR) was founded and while regular private clubs were still banned under Soviet occupation, efforts were made to play football anyway. Helmut Schön coached selections of Saxony and the Soviet occupation zone before moving to the West. On 6 February 1951, the GDR applied for FIFA membership, which was protested against by the German Football Association, which was already a full member. FIFA accepted the GDR association (later called DFV) on 6 October 1951 as a provisional member and on 24 July 1952 as a full member.

The first international game, not competitive but rather a display of goodwill, took place on 21 September 1952 against Poland in Warsaw, losing 3–0 in front of a crowd of 35,000. The first home game was on 14 June 1953 against Bulgaria, a 0–0 draw in front of a crowd of 55,000 at Heinz-Steyer-Stadion in Dresden. Only three days later, the Uprising of 1953 in East Germany would have prevented the permitted assembly of that many Germans. On 8 May 1954 games resumed, with a 1–0 loss against Romania. The East Germans had not even considered entering the World Cup which was won by the West Germans two months later. This caused much euphoria not only in the West, and the GDR tried to counter this by abandoning their policy of presenting a group of politically-reliable socialist role models of their "new German state"; instead, players were selected purely according to ability. The GDR entered the qualification for the WC 1958 and were hosts to Wales on 19 May 1957 at the Zentralstadion in Leipzig. 500,000 tickets were requested, and officially 100,000 were admitted, but 120,000 in the crowded house witnessed a 2-1 victory.

East Germany was not as successful as its Western counterpart in World Cups or European Championships. It had only qualified for one major tournament in its history, the 1974 World Cup. However, they were always serious contenders in qualifying throughout their history.

That tournament was staged in West Germany, and both German teams were drawn into the same group in the first round. With successful games against Chile and Australia, both German teams had qualified early for the second round, with the inter-German game determining first and second in the group. Despite this lack of pressure to succeed, the match on 22 June 1974 in Hamburg was politically and emotionally charged. East Germany beat West Germany 1–0, thanks to a goal by Jürgen Sparwasser. This was rather a Pyrrhic victory, as the DFV wound up in the possibly stronger second round of Group A. The GDR lost to Brazil and the Netherlands, but secured 3rd place in a final game draw with Argentina. On the other hand, the DFB team changed its line-up after the loss and went on to win all games in the other second round group B, against Yugoslavia, Sweden, and Poland, and the World title against the Netherlands.

East Germany nearly secured qualification for the 1990 World Cup, needing only a draw versus Austria in Vienna in their final group match on 15 November 1989 to achieve a place in Italy. However, Toni Polster scored three times as Austria won 3–0 and advanced to the finals instead.

The GDR took part in the draw for the qualification for the European Championship 1992 and was drawn in Group 5 together with the FRG, Belgium, Wales, and Luxembourg. On October 3 in 1990 Germany was re-unified and with them their football teams. The scheduled matches of the East German team were canceled, except for two matches. The match against Belgium was converted into a friendly match on September 12, 1990, in Brussels. It was the last match played by the East Germany national team and ended with a 2–0 victory for them. The match between East and West Germany remained and was scheduled to be played on November 14, 1990, to celebrate the unification of Germany. Due to riots by East German spectators, it was canceled.

Millions of East Germans had moved to the West before the Berlin Wall was erected in 1961, and some escaped in successful Republikflucht attempts also afterward. All East Germans were automatically entitled to receive a West German passport, but players who had caps for the DFV, like Norbert Nachtweih and Jürgen Pahl who fled in October 1976 at a U21 match in Turkey, were ineligible for international competition for the DFB due to FIFA rules. Lutz Eigendorf had escaped to the West in 1979 and died in 1983 in a mysterious car crash in which East German Stasi agents were involved. 

Shortly after reunification, players who had played for the East German team were allowed by FIFA to be eligible for the now un-rivaled German team of the DFB. A total of eight players have been capped for both East Germany and unified Germany, among them Matthias Sammer and Ulf Kirsten.

Olympic football

East Germany did however achieve significantly greater success in Olympic football than the amateur teams fielded by the Western NOC of Germany due to using its elite players from the top domestic league. In 1956, 1960, and 1964 both states had sent a United Team of Germany. For 1964, the East German side had beaten their Western counterparts in order to be selected. They went on to win the Bronze for Germany. As GDR, they won Bronze in 1972 in Munich, Gold in 1976, and silver medal in 1980 in Moscow.

East vs. West

Over the years of their separate existence, the GDR and FRG played each other only a handful of times. The only notable meeting with professionals from the West was at the 1974 World Cup, which East Germany won 1–0. Three other games were played in Olympic Football where only players with amateur status could represent West Germany, like the young Uli Hoeneß who delayed his pro career in 1972. In the inter-German qualification prior to the 1964 Olympic Games, the two played a two-legged preliminary round tie, the GDR advancing to represent Germany as they won their home leg 3–0, while the FRG won the return 2–1. In the 1972 Olympic Games, the GDR and FRG, having qualified from their First Round groups, met in the Second Round, with the GDR winning 3–2.

The draw for 1992 UEFA European Football Championship qualifying took place on 2 February 1990, with East Germany drawn in Group 5 along with Belgium, Wales, Luxembourg – and West Germany. By 23 August that year, the East German parliament confirmed reunification for 3 October. The planning for the opening fixture away to Belgium on 12 September was too far along to be canceled, so it was played as a friendly. It was also planned to play East Germany's home fixture against West Germany, scheduled for 21 November 1990 in Leipzig, as a friendly to celebrate the unification of the DFB and DFV, but the game was canceled due to rioting in East German stadia.

Competitive record

FIFA World Cup

 Champions   Runners-up   Third place   Fourth place

UEFA European Championship

Olympic Games

Player records

Players with caps for both East Germany and unified Germany
The rules of FIFA prevented players who had caps for the DFV team from playing for the DFB team before the unification of DFB and DFV in 1990. 
The numbers are from the website of the DFB.

Coaches
1952–1953  Willi Oelgardt
1954            Hans Siegert
1955–1957  János Gyarmati
1958–1959  Fritz Gödicke
1959–1961  Heinz Krügel
1961–1967  Károly Sós
1967–1969  Harald Seeger
1970–1981  Georg Buschner
1982–1983  Rudolf Krause
1983–1988  Bernd Stange
1988–1989  Manfred Zapf
1989–1990  Eduard Geyer

See also

 East Germany national under-21 football team

Notes

References

External links

DFB statistics of the national team (contains information on East Germany caps and goalscorers)
RSSSF archive of East Germany results
RSSSF history of East Germany national team
RSSSF record of East Germany international caps and goals

 
Former national association football teams in Europe
1952 establishments in East Germany
National sports teams established in 1952